Zlatko Papec (17 January 1934 – 3 February 2013) was a Croatian footballer.

Club career
He began his career playing as a left winger at Zagreb's Lokomotiva, at the time when the club was a regular member of the Yugoslav First League, and was part of the greatest attacking lineup in the history of the club, alongside Josip Odžak, Vladimir Čonč, Vladimir Firm and Drago Hmelina. Papec appeared in 57 league matches for Lokomotiva in the period from 1952 to 1955, when he was conscripted and then served the compulsory military service in the Yugoslav Navy.

After leaving the navy he joined Hajduk Split in 1956 and stayed with the club until 1964. In this period he appeared in a total of 366 matches and scored 167 goals (including 177 appearances and 55 goals in the First League). In 1964 he moved abroad and joined second level West German side Freiburger FC, where he established himself as a first team regular immediately upon arrival and appeared in 130 matches in his four seasons with club. In 1968, he returned to Yugoslavia and briefly joined NK Rijeka. He had effectively retired in the late 1960s, although he later returned to the pitch and had a brief stint with second-level side NK Junak Sinj in the 1971–1972 season.

International career
Papec was capped for Yugoslavia six times between 1953 and 1956. He made his debut on 14 May 1953 in a friendly against Belgium played at Heysel Stadium and his last international game was a friendly against Indonesia held on 23 December 1956 in Jakarta. He was also a member of the Yugoslav squad which reached the quarter-finals at the 1954 World Cup and was part of the Yugoslav team which won silver medal at the 1956 Summer Olympics in Melbourne.

International goals

References

External links

1934 births
2013 deaths
Footballers from Zagreb
Association football forwards
Yugoslav footballers
Yugoslavia international footballers
1954 FIFA World Cup players
Footballers at the 1956 Summer Olympics
Olympic footballers of Yugoslavia
Olympic silver medalists for Yugoslavia
Olympic medalists in football
Medalists at the 1956 Summer Olympics
NK Lokomotiva Zagreb players
HNK Hajduk Split players
Freiburger FC players
HNK Rijeka players
NK Junak Sinj players
Yugoslav expatriate footballers
Expatriate footballers in West Germany
Yugoslav expatriate sportspeople in West Germany
Yugoslav football managers
RNK Split managers
NK Maribor managers
Burials at Lovrinac Cemetery